The Open the Triangle Gate Championship is a professional wrestling trios title in Japanese promotion Dragon Gate. It was created on November 7, 2004 when The Italian Connection faction of Milano Collection A.T., Anthony W. Mori and Yossino defeated Aagan Iisou's Shuji Kondo, Takuya Sugawara and "brother" Yasshi in a tournament final. Each title belt's face has three emblems on it, shaped in a triangle, that represent Power, Technique and Mind.

Not including interim reigns, there have been a total of 65 recognized individual champions and 72 recognized trios, who have had a combined 84 official reigns. The current champions are Gold Class (Ben-K, BxB Hulk and Kota Minoura) who are in their first reign as a team.

Title history

Combined reigns 

{| class="wikitable sortable" style="text-align: center"
!Rank
!Team
!No. ofreigns
!Combineddefenses
!Combineddays
|-
!1
| Natural Vibes || 2 || 7 || 343
|-
!2
| Blood Generation || 1 || 3 || 319
|-
!3
| Monster Express  || 1 || 5 || 273
|-
!4
| Jimmyz  || 3 || 3 || 235
|-
!5
| R.E.D || 1 || 3 || 210
|-
!6
| Team Dragon Gate || 1 || 1 || 205
|-
!7
| Zetsurins || 1 || 3 || 203
|-
!8
| Do Fixer || 3 || 2 || 173
|-
!9
| Mushozoku || 1 || 3 || 168
|-
!10
| Warriors  || 2 || 4 || 161
|-
!11
| Oretachi Veteran-gun || 2 || 2 || 150
|-
!12
|Strong Machine Gundan || 1 || 3 || 147
|-
!13
| New Hazard || 2 || 2 || 144
|-
!rowspan=2|14
| Blood Warriors || 1 || 5 || 140
|-
| Zetsurins || 1 || 3 || 140
|-
!16
| Blood Warriors || 1 || 3 || 139
|-
!17
| MASQUERADE  || 1 || 2 || 138
|-
!18
| MaxiMuM || 1 || 2 || 134
|-
!19
| World-1 || 1 || 2 || 129
|-
!20
| VerserK || 1 || 1 || 125
|-
!21
| Mad Blankey || 1 || 3 || 117
|-
!22
| Italian Connection || 1 || 2 || 108
|-
!23
| MaxiMuM || 1 || 1 || 103
|-
!24
| Muscle Outlaw'z || 2 || 3 || 100
|-
!25
| Jimmyz || 1 || 4 || 100
|-
!26
| M3K || 1 || 3 || 99
|-
!27
| World-1 International || 1 || 1 || 94
|-
!28
| Dia.Hearts  || 1 || 3 || 91
|-
!29
| Millennials  || 1 || 1 || 90
|-
!30
| R.E.D. || 2 || 2 || 86
|-
!31
| Real Hazard || 1 || 2 || 78
|-
!rowspan=3|32
| World-1 International || 1 || 5 || 77
|-
| Jimmyz  || 1 || 2 || 77
|-
| Z-Brats || 1 || 2 || 77
|-
!35
| Junction Three  || 1 || 2 || 76
|-
!36
| R.E.D. || 1 || 2 || 71
|-
!rowspan=2|37
| Jimmyz  || 1 || 1 || 70
|-
| Los Perros del Mal de Japón || 2 || 2 || 70
|-
!39
| Jimmyz  || 1 || 0 || 69
|-
!40
| Mad Blankey || 1 || 2 || 63
|-
!41
| Naoki Tanizaki, Takuya Sugawara and Yasushi Kanda || 1 || 1 || 62
|-
!42
| Gold Class || 1 || 0 || 61
|-
!43
| Mad Blankey || 1 || 1 || 60
|-
!44
| KAMIKAZE || 1 || 2 || 59
|-
!45
|style="background-color:#FFE6BD"| Gold Class † || 1 || 2 || +
|-
!rowspan=2|46
| Jimmyz  || 1 || 3 || 55
|-
|R.E.D.  || 1 || 0 || 55
|-
!48
| Warriors-5 || 1 || 1 || 53
|-
!49
| Tribe Vanguard || 1 || 0 || 50
|-
!50
| Muscle Outlaw'z || 1 || 0 || 49
|-
!51
| Real Hazard || 1 || 1 || 45
|-
!52
|R.E.D.  || 1 || 1 || 43
|-
!53
| BxB Hulk, Cima and Jack Evans || 1 || 0 || 41
|-
!54
| Typhoon || 2 || 2 || 40
|-
!55
| MASQUERADE || 1 || 0 || 28
|-
!56
| Kaettekita Veteran-gun  || 1 || 1 || 27
|-
!57
| Pos.Hearts || 1 || 0 || 26
|-
!58
| Jimmyz  || 1 || 1 || 24
|-
!59
| Team Toryumon  || 1 || 0 || 21
|-
!60
| Oretachi Veteran-gun || 1 || 0 || 19
|-
!61
| Millennials || 1 || 0 || 17
|-
!rowspan=2|62
| Momo No Seishun Tag || 1 || 0 || 15
|-
| VerserK || 1 || 0 || 15
|-
!64
| Tozawajuku || 1 || 0 || 14
|-
!65
| Natural Vibes || 1 || 0 || 13
|-
!66
| M2K || 1 || 0 || 11
|-
!67
| Deep Drunkers || 1 || 0 || 8
|-
!rowspan=3|68
| Blood Generation || 1 || 1 || 6
|-
| Muscle Outlaw'z || 1 || 0 || 6
|-
| World-1 International || 1 || 0 || 6
|-
!71
| World-1  || 1 || 0 || 4
|-
!72
| Stinger || 1 || 0 || 1
|-

By wrestler 

{|class="wikitable sortable" style="text-align: center"
!Rank
!Wrestler
!data-sort-type="number"|No. ofreigns
!data-sort-type="number"|Combineddefenses
!data-sort-type="number"|Combineddays	
|-
!1
| Yossino/Masato Yoshino || 11 || 22 || 1,283
|-
!2
| Genki Horiguchi H.A.Gee.Mee!!/Genki Horiguchi || 13 || 18 || 1,158
|-
!3
| Cima || 11 || 17 || 910
|-
!4
| Naruki Doi || 14 || 19 || 897
|-
!5
| Gamma/Strong Machine G || 13 || 19 || 843
|-
!6
| Cyber Kong/Takashi Yoshida || 10 || 13 || 839
|-
!7
| Don Fujii/Strong Machine F || 7 || 18 || 814
|-
!8
| Jimmy Susumu/Susumu Yokosuka/Susumu Mochizuki || 11 || 18 || 788
|-
!9
| Ryo "Jimmy" Saito/Ryo Saito || 13 || 14 || 762
|-
!10
| Masaaki Mochizuki || 7 || 15 || 731
|-
!11
| Jimmy Kanda/Yasushi Kanda || 9 || 10 || 686
|-
!12
| Kzy || 7 || 12 || 670
|-
!13
|style="background-color:#FFE6BD"| BxB Hulk † || 9 || 9 || +
|-
!14
| Magnitude Kishiwada || 5 || 7 || 541
|-
!15
| Dragon Kid || 8 || 12 || 502
|-
!16
| T-Hawk || 5 || 8 || 459
|-
!17
| Shingo Takagi || 6 || 6 || 387
|-
!18
| Mr. Kyu Kyu/Naoki Tanizaki/Toyonaka Dolphin || 6 || 12 || 384
|-
!19
|style="background-color:#FFE6BD"| Ben-K † || 3 || 4 || +
|-
!20
| Strong Machine J || 2 || 4 || 362
|-
!21
| Dragon Dia || 2 || 3 || 343
|-
!22
| Akira Tozawa || 2 || 7 || 336
|-
!23
| Kazma Sakamoto || 3 || 6 || 324
|-
!24
| Yamato || 5 || 6 || 309
|-
!25
| Jason Lee || 3 || 4 || 300
|-
!26
| Eita || 6 || 5 || 263
|-
!27
| Pac || 3 || 7 || 210
|-
!28
| Akebono || 1 || 3 || 203
|-
!29
| K-Ness || 3 || 3 || 198
|-
!30
| Big R Shimizu || 2 || 4 || 194
|-
!31
| Kaito Ishida || 3 || 2 || 147
|-
!32
|style="background-color:#FFE6BD"| Kota Minoura † || 3 || 2 || +
|-
!33
| H.Y.O || 3 || 2 || 142
|-
!34
| Ricochet || 1 || 5 || 140
|-
!35
| La Estrella || 1 || 2 || 139
|-
!36
| Anthony W. Mori || 2 || 2 || 134
|-
!37
| Kagetora/Jimmy Kagetora || 2 || 3 || 130
|-
!38
| El Lindaman || 1 || 1 || 125
|-
!39
| Milano Collection AT || 1 || 2 || 108
|-
!40
| Shun Skywalker || 2 || 2 || 105
|-
!41
| U-T || 2 || 1 || 103
|-
!42
| Shachihoko Boy || 2 || 1 || 100
|-
!43
| Mochizuki Jr. || 1 || 3 || 99
|-
!44
| Diamante || 2 || 1 || 98
|-
!45
| Rich Swann || 1 || 1 || 94
|-
!rowspan=2|46
| Ishin Iihashi/Ishin || 1 || 2 || 77
|-
| Kai || 1 || 2 || 77
|-
!48
| Taku Iwasa || 2 || 2 || 73
|-
!49
| Kento Kobune/SB KENTo || 1 || 2 || 71
|-
!rowspan=3|50
| Takuya Sugawara || 2 || 2 || 70
|-
| Nosawa Rongai || 2 || 2 || 70
|-
| Kotaro Suzuki || 2 || 2 || 70
|-
!53
| Jack Evans || 1 || 0 || 41
|-
!54
| Kenichiro Arai || 2 || 0 || 35
|-
!55
| HUB || 1 || 1 || 27
|-
!56
| Super Shisa || 1 || 0 || 26
|-
!57
| Flamita || 1 || 0 || 17
|-
!rowspan=3|58
| Atsushi Kotoge || 1 || 0 || 15
|-
| Daisuke Harada || 1 || 0 || 15
|-
| Yo-Hey || 1 || 0 || 15
|-
!61
| Shinobu || 1 || 0 || 14
|-
!62
| Jacky "Funky" Kamei || 1 || 0 || 13
|-
!rowspan=3|63
| Yoshinari Ogawa || 1 || 0 || 1
|-
| Seiki Yoshioka || 1 || 0 || 1
|-
| Yuya Susumu || 1 || 0 || 1
|-

See also
WAR World Six-Man Tag Team Championship
UWA World Trios Championship
KO-D 6-Man Tag Team Championship

References

External links
Official title history
DGUSA title history
Wrestling-Titles.com title history
 Open the Triangle Gate Championship

Dragon Gate (wrestling) championships
Trios wrestling tag team championships